The Charter of Democracy was signed by Nawaz Sharif of Pakistan Muslim League and Benazir Bhutto of Pakistan Peoples Party on May 14, 2006 in London. The document, signaling an alliance between two significant political parties of Pakistan, outlines steps to end the military rule established by the 1999 Pakistani coup d'état led by General Pervez Musharraf and restore civilian democratic rule.

References

External links
 Daily Times Charter of Democracy
 Charter of Democracy on PML (N) website
 Charter of Democracy on PPP website

Pakistani democracy movements
Benazir Bhutto
Nawaz Sharif administration
Political history of Pakistan